Ramification may refer to:

Ramification (mathematics), a geometric term used for 'branching out', in the way that the square root function, for complex numbers, can be seen to have two branches differing in sign.
Ramification (botany), the divergence of the stem and limbs of a plant into smaller ones
Ramification group, filtration of the Galois group of a local field extension
Ramification theory of valuations, studies the set of extensions of a valuation v of a field K to an extension L of K
Ramification problem, in philosophy and artificial intelligence, concerned with the indirect consequences of an action.
Type theory, Ramified Theory of Types by mathematician Bertrand Russell